Jarosław Drelich (1957) is a Polish-born surface engineer and professor of materials science at Michigan Technological University (Houghton, Michigan). He also holds an adjunct professorship in the department of Chemical and Materials Engineering at the University of Alberta (Alberta, Canada). He is known primarily for his contributions to the field of wetting phenomena, which include the effect of drop/bubble size on apparent contact angle on a rough surface, in addition to fundamental work on structured hydrophilic/hydrophobic alternating surfaces.

Drelich has authored more than 130 scientific papers and 8 patents. , he has an h-index of 25 and according to Google Scholar, his articles have been cited over 2100 times. Drelich is a member of the External Advisory Board for the Journal of Adhesion Science and Technology and founding editor-in-chief of the journal Surface Innovations.

Professional service 
Professionally, Drelich is active in both The Minerals, Metals & Materials Society and the Society for Mining, Metallurgy, and Exploration. He has chaired, co-chaired, and developed many symposia for these organizations' meetings in addition to providing service to many of the technical divisions and committees..

References 

Living people
1957 births
Michigan Technological University faculty
University of Utah alumni
Gdańsk University of Technology alumni